A wain is a farm wagon.

Wain may also refer to:

 Wain (surname)
 Wani (surname), or Wain, Kashmiri surname
 Wain (Württemberg), Germany

See also 
 Wayne (disambiguation)
 Wein
 WAYN (disambiguation)
 Waine Pryce
 The Haywain Triptych
 The Hay Wain